Francis McAvoy may refer to:

 Frank McAvoy (1875–?), Scottish footballer
 Francis S. McAvoy (c. 1850–1926), American lawyer and politician from New York